The second USS Ella (SP-1676) was a patrol vessel briefly under United States Navy control during 1917.

Ella was built as a private motorboat of the same name in 1902. On 8 October 1917, the U.S. Navy acquired her from her owner for use as a section patrol boat during World War I. She was given the section patrol number SP-1676.

Apparently very quickly deemed unsuitable for naval service, Ella was returned to her owner on 29 October 1917.

References
 
 SP-1676 Ella at Department of the Navy Naval History and Heritage Command Online Library of Selected Images: U.S. Navy Ships -- Listed by Hull Number: "SP" #s and "ID" #s -- World War I Era Patrol Vessels and other Acquired Ships and Craft numbered from ID # 1600 through ID # 1699
 NavSource Online: Section Patrol Craft Photo Archive Ella (SP 1676)

Patrol vessels of the United States Navy
World War I patrol vessels of the United States
1902 ships